Salgado River may refer to several rivers in Brazil:

 Salgado River (Alagoas)
 Salgado River (Ceará)
 Salgado River (Rio Grande do Norte)
 Salgado River (São Francisco River)
 Salgado River (Sergipe River)
 Salgado River (Vaza-Barris River)